The men's coxed four competition at the 1988 Summer Olympics took place at Misari Regatta, South Korea. It was held from 19 to 24 September. There were 14 boats (71 competitors, with Romania making one substitution) from 14 nations, with each nation limited to a single boat in the event. The event was won by East Germany, returning to the top of the podium after the Soviet-led boycott in 1984 prevented the East Germans from defending their 1980 Olympic title. Silver went to Romania, its first medal in the men's coxed four. New Zealand took a second consecutive bronze medal in the event.

Background

This was the 18th appearance of the event. Rowing had been on the programme in 1896 but was cancelled due to bad weather. The coxed four was one of the four initial events introduced in 1900. It was not held in 1904 or 1908, but was held at every Games from 1912 to 1992 when it (along with the men's coxed pair) was replaced with the men's lightweight double sculls and men's lightweight coxless four.

East Germany was dominant in the men's coxed four, winning 7 of the last 9 World Championships (and placing second and third in the other two) as well as winning the 1980 Olympics; a boycott was seemingly the only way to keep the East Germans off the podium, as had happened at the 1984 Games. With their return to Olympic competition in 1988, they were heavily favoured. Great Britain, the defending Olympic champion from a reduced field, was a potential challenger. The Soviet Union, New Zealand, Italy, and the United States had medaled at the last two World Championships and were also outside contenders.

South Korea made its debut in the event, the first nation to do so since 1976. The United States made its 15th appearance, most of any nation to that point.

Competition format

The coxed four event featured five-person boats, with four rowers and a coxswain. It was a sweep rowing event, with the rowers each having one oar (and thus each rowing on one side). The competition used the 2000 metres distance that became standard at the 1912 Olympics and which has been used ever since except at the 1948 Games.

The competition consisted of three main rounds (quarterfinals, semifinals, and finals) as well as a repechage. The 14 boats were divided into three heats for the quarterfinals, with 4 or 5 boats in each heat. The top three boats in each heat (9 boats total) advanced directly to the semifinals. The remaining 5 boats were placed in the repechage. The repechage featured a single heat, with the top three boats advancing to the semifinals and the remaining 2 boats (4th and 5th placers in the repechage) being eliminated (13th and 14th place overall). The 12 semifinalist boats were divided into two heats of 6 boats each. The top three boats in each semifinal (6 boats total) advanced to the "A" final to compete for medals and 4th through 6th place; the bottom three boats in each semifinal were sent to the "B" final for 7th through 12th.

Schedule

All times are Korea Standard Time adjusted for daylight savings (UTC+10)

Results

Quarterfinals

Quarterfinal 1

Quarterfinal 2

Quarterfinal 3

Repechage

Semifinals

Semifinal 1

Semifinal 2

Finals

Final B

Final A

Final classification

References

Rowing at the 1988 Summer Olympics
Men's events at the 1988 Summer Olympics